Graham Moore Bay is an Arctic waterway in Qikiqtaaluk Region, Nunavut, Canada. Located off northern Bathurst Island, the bay is an arm of Viscount Melville Sound.

It was named by Sir William Edward Parry in honor of Vice-Admiral Sir Graham Moore.

References

Bays of Qikiqtaaluk Region